Dylan Dresdow aka "3-D", is an audio mixer. He has mixed songs for such artists as Prince, Michael Jackson, Madonna, Usher, Black Eyed Peas, Nas, Afrojack,  Talib Kweli, Britney Spears, Ice Cube, Redman, The Wu Tang Clan, Bone Thugs-n-Harmony, Xzibit, Missy Elliott, Tweet, Christina Aguilera, P!nk, The Game, Ricky Martin, Rihanna, Chris Brown, Far East Movement, K'NAAN, Hollywood Undead, Common, and Flo Rida.

In 2008, Dylan received an Emmy Award for his work on the "Yes We Can" music video.  In 2009, Dresdow won a Grammy Award for his mix work on the Black Eyed Peas album The E.N.D. In 2013, Dresdow was inducted into the Full Sail Hall of Fame.

References

External links

Living people
American audio engineers
Grammy Award winners
Year of birth missing (living people)